Nahran (also Romanized as Nahrān) is a village in Khanamrud Rural District, in the Central District of Heris County, East Azerbaijan Province, Iran. At the 2006 census, its population was 357, in 82 families.

References 

Populated places in Heris County